This is a list of properties and historic districts on the National Register of Historic Places in Old Louisville, Kentucky (roughly bounded by York St. and E. Jacob St. on the north; S. Floyd St. and I-65 on the east; E. Brandeis St. on the south; and S. 5th St., S. 7th St. and the CSX Railroad tracks on the west). Latitude and longitude coordinates of the 33 sites listed on this page may be displayed in a map or exported in several formats by clicking on one of the links in the adjacent box.

National Register sites elsewhere in Jefferson County are listed separately.

Current listings

|}

See also
 National Register of Historic Places listings in Jefferson County, Kentucky
 List of National Historic Landmarks in Kentucky
 List of attractions and events in the Louisville metropolitan area

References

Old